Hollyhock Island is an inhabited island in the River Thames in England on the reach between Bell Weir Lock and Penton Hook Lock.

Location 
The island is situated in a small channel between the larger Holm Island and the north bank of the Thames. It is located in Berkshire, in the Royal Borough of Windsor and Maidenhead, near the county boundary with Surrey. Until county boundary changes in 1974, the island was within the county of Buckinghamshire and near the border with Middlesex.

Upstream of the island is Runnymede Bridge carrying the M25 motorway. Downstream is Church Island and Staines Bridge. The island is on the reach between Bell Weir Lock and Penton Hook Lock.

The 25-inch scale Ordnance Survey Great Britain County Series map, published in the 1890s, shows that the island was connected to both the north bank and Holm Island by footbridges. By the time of the 1962 25-inch Ordnance Survey map, these footbridges no longer existed.

Use 
On the island was "The Nest", a house allegedly used by the future king Edward VIII and Wallis Simpson as a romantic getaway.  Current Ordnance Survey mapping shows no buildings on the island and no connection with the mainland.

See also
Islands in the River Thames

Footnotes

References

Islands of the River Thames
Uninhabited islands of England
Royal Borough of Windsor and Maidenhead